Semblis phalaenoides, the spotted caddis fly, is a species of caddisfly in the Phryganeidae family. It is found in Fennoscandia, Poland, the Baltic region, Belarus and Russia.

Larvae have been reared on freshly killed mosquitoes, flies and tiny juveniles of fish.

References

Trichoptera
Insects described in 1758
Insects of Europe
Taxa named by Carl Linnaeus